The Accessibility for Manitobans Act was created by the Manitoba Government and has been in effect since December 5, 2013.  The purpose of the legislation is to prevent and remove barriers that affect persons with disabilities.  It will be implemented through the introduction of five standards: customer service, information and communication, transportation, employment and the built environment.  

The Accessibility Standard for Customer Service came into effect November 1, 2015.

The Accessibility Standard for Employment came into effect May 1, 2019.

The Accessibility Standard for Information and Communication came into effect May 1, 2022.

See also
 Ontarians with Disabilities Act for the corresponding Ontario legislation.
 Nova Scotia Accessibility Act for the corresponding Nova Scotia legislation.
 Accessible British Columbia Act for the corresponding British Columbia legislation.
 Accessible Canada Act
 Disability Discrimination Act for the corresponding UK legislation.
 Americans with Disabilities Act of 1990 for the corresponding American legislation.

External links 
 Text of the Accessibility for Manitobans Act
 The Accessibility for Manitobans Act - Official Site

2013 in Canadian law
Disability legislation
Disability law in Canada
Manitoba law
Anti-discrimination law in Canada
2013 in Manitoba
Manitoba provincial legislation
Disability in Canada